Fred Bradley Hunstable (born 1978) is an American businessman and the co-founder and CEO of the electric motor company Linear Labs.

Linear Labs was founded by Hunstable in 2014 with his father, Fred Hunstable. Brad is also the co-founder and former CEO of UStream which was sold to IBM in 2016 for $150 million.

Hunstable was formerly the founder and CEO of San Francisco, California-based live streaming website Ustream.tv, one of the largest consumer live video sites on the Internet. In 2014, he was honored as one of the SF Business Times "40 Under 40" for the most influential young leaders across the spectrum of Bay Area businesses. In 2016, Ustream was acquired by IBM for a reported $150 million.

Ranked among 50 "Digital Power Players" by The Hollywood Reporter in 2010, Hunstable was announced on Variety Producers Guild of America's 2010 Digital 25: Visionaries, Innovators and Producers list for his work at Ustream.

Ustream was selected as a PC Magazine Editor's Choice.  Notable investors include Softbank,  DCM, Frank J. Caufield, and the Band Of Angels. General Wesley Clark serves Ustream.TV's board of advisors.

Hunstable is the father of three children. One of them, Hayden, died on April 17, 2020 after committing suicide. The Hunstable family set up the charity Hayden’s Corner, in his honour.

Biography

Early life
Fred Bradley Hunstable was born on September 26, 1978 in Tarrant County, Texas, and grew up in Granbury, Texas, with a younger sister (Ashlee) and a younger brother (Nathan). His parents are Fred Eugene Hunstable, an electrical engineer, and Candace "Candy" Lee Cotter, a school teacher. Since childhood, he has shown an interest in technology.  At age 11, he started a small bulletin board system called the Dark Realms with cosysop James Gollehon.

Education
Hunstable graduated from Granbury High School in Granbury, Texas in 1997. He went on to receive his Bachelor of Science degree in engineering management from the United States Military Academy in 2001. Upon graduation, he was commissioned as a second lieutenant in the U.S. Army, working primarily as an operations officer. Later, through the Army, Hunstable attended the Ohio State University's Fisher College of Business where he received his Master of Business Administration degree in finance and real estate in 2005.

After West Point
Hunstable was required to serve five years in the U.S. Army.  He served in various capacities around the world working jobs both for the Army and the Department of Defense directly.

In 2005, he left the military to work for Hillwood Development, a real estate company owned by Ross Perot developing master planned communities in Dallas/Fort Worth.

Ustream
Ustream was born when the founders (John Ham, Brad Hunstable, and Dr. Gyula Feher) wanted a way for their friends in the Army, who were deployed overseas in Iraq during the war, to be able to communicate with their families back home. A product like Ustream would provide them with a way to talk to all of their relatives at once when free time in the war zone was limited.

Previously, these three had worked together on an internet based event photo sharing website using technology created by Dr. Feher.  In 2003, both Brad and John Ham were deployed to active duty, putting an end to this venture. After returning to civilian life, Brad and John discussed the idea of the general public using the Internet to share live video.  Seeing this as a viable product, they contacted their former partner, Dr. Feher, to develop the technology required.  Ustream.tv was founded in 2006, as experiments in broadcasting Brad's brother Nathan's band (Venture) proved successful.  Early testing involved Brad in the audience with a camera wired to a laptop (with a cellular card) in his backpack, sending the stream back to their test server.

Launching their public beta in March 2007, Ustream.tv was the first of a series of live video sites include Justin.tv and Operator11.com. The company has seen "growth" in the political, entertainment, and technology fields.

Ustream.tv have hosted streamings from politicians Hillary Clinton, Barack Obama, and John Edwards and artists Tori Amos and the Plain White T's.  The technology community has also adopted Ustream to include Robert Scoble, Leo Laporte, Chris Pirillo, Scott Liberto and Cali Lewis.

Ustream.tv has raised over $60 million in funding, most recently from Softbank.

Personal life
Hunstable is married to April Hunstable and they have three children together.

He has two siblings, Nathan Hunstable and Ashlee Smith.

Hunstable's son, Hayden, died from suicide on April 17, 2020.
The Hunstables started the non-profit, Hayden's Corner, to promote parents starting conversations with their children to help prevent childhood suicide, the #3 cause of death in 10-14 year olds.

References

American computer businesspeople
United States Military Academy alumni
People from Tarrant County, Texas
1978 births
Living people
People from Granbury, Texas
Ohio State University Fisher College of Business alumni
Military personnel from Texas